The following lists are the squad list for the 2019 OFC Futsal Nations Cup.
For the 2019 OFC Futsal Nations Cup, the 8 participating national teams must submit squads of 12 players – of which 2 must be goalkeepers.

Squads

Head coach:  Tunoa Lui

Head coach: Mira Sahib

Head coach:  Juliano Schmeling

Head coach:

Head coach:  Vinicius De Carvalho Leite

Head coach: Jean-Baptiste Barsinas

Head coach: Manu Tu'alau

Head coach: Richard Lehi

References

2019 in futsal